Bertino de Souza (9 May 1933 – 17 June 1999) was a Brazilian sports shooter. He competed at the 1972 Summer Olympics and the 1976 Summer Olympics.

References

External links
 

1933 births
1999 deaths
Brazilian male sport shooters
Olympic shooters of Brazil
Shooters at the 1972 Summer Olympics
Shooters at the 1976 Summer Olympics
Sportspeople from Bahia
Pan American Games medalists in shooting
Pan American Games gold medalists for Brazil
Shooters at the 1971 Pan American Games
20th-century Brazilian people